Anagrus frequens is a species of fairyfly.

References

Mymaridae